Mkansa may refer to:
Lamkansa, Casablanca-Settat, a town in Nouaceur Province, Casablanca-Settat, Morocco
Mkansa, Taounate Province, a commune in Taounate Province, Fès-Meknès, Morocco